The GM A platform (commonly called A-body) was a rear wheel drive automobile platform designation used by General Motors from 1925 until 1959, and again from 1964 to 1981. In 1982, GM introduced a new front wheel drive A platform, and existing intermediate rear wheel drive products were redesignated as G-bodies.

1926-1959

The earliest GM A-bodied based cars shared a common chassis with the Chevrolet Superior, with Pontiac Six replacing Oakland starting in 1926. Oldsmobile also used the A-body for the 1938-48 Series 60. All Chevrolets produced during this period, to include the Chevrolet Master and the Chevrolet Deluxe, and all 1936-39 Pontiacs, the 1940 Pontiac Special, the 1941 Pontiac Deluxe Torpedo and all Pontiac Torpedoes produced from 1942 through 1948 were A-bodies.

From 1949 to 1957, only Chevrolets (150, 210, Bel Air, Del Ray) and  Pontiacs (Chieftain, Star Chief, Super Chief) were built on the A-body. These cars were moved to the new B Body shared with some Buicks and Oldsmobiles in 1958, and all truck conversions were replaced by the C/K series in 1960.

Vehicles underpinned 

 1923-1926 Chevrolet Superior
 1923-1931 GM Oakland
 1933-1942 Chevrolet Master
 1936-1939 Oldsmobile Series F
 1940-1948 Oldsmobile Series 60
 1941-1952 Chevrolet Deluxe
 1941-1947 Chevrolet A/K Series
 1941-1947 GMC A/K Series
 1946-1948 Chevrolet Stylemaster
 1946-1948 Chevrolet Fleetmaster
 1947-1955 Chevrolet Advance Design
 1947-1955 GMC New Design
 1949-1950 Oldsmobile 88
 1949-1949 Oldsmobile 76
 1926-1940 Pontiac Six
 1949-1957 Pontiac Chieftain
 1950-1958 Pontiac Catalina
 1954-1957 Pontiac Star Chief
 1955-1959 Chevrolet Task Force Series
 1955-1959 GMC Blue Chip Series

1964–1967

The A-body platform was reintroduced as an intermediate-sized platform introduced in the 1964 model year for two redesigned  and two new mid-sized cars from four of GM divisions. Notable examples include the FR layout Chevrolet Chevelle, Buick Special, Oldsmobile Cutlass and Pontiac Tempest. The A-body cars were the first intermediate-sized cars designed with a full perimeter frame and four-link coil-spring rear suspension, similar to that introduced on full-sized Pontiacs and Oldsmobiles in 1961 and on all other GM full-sized cars in 1965.

The Chevrolet A-body line included the El Camino coupe utility. Two station wagons based on the A-body used stretched wheelbases and raised rear roof sections with skylights: the 1964–1972 Oldsmobile Vista Cruiser and the 1964–69 Buick Sport Wagon.

Some of GM's most successful products in the muscle car era were A-body models, including the Pontiac GTO, Chevrolet Malibu SS, Oldsmobile 442 and Buick GS. From 1964 to 1969, GM Canada produced a special-market version of the Chevelle called the Beaumont, which included Pontiac-type trim and unique front grilles as well as taillight assemblies.

However, Pontiac fitted its  V8 in the Lemans to create the GTO — commonly considered the first popular muscle car. Though this violated the 330 cu in limit, Pontiac got around the rules by designating the GTO as a low-volume option package rather than a specific model. The 400 cu in limit for A-body cars, as well as for other GM cars that were smaller than full-sized (with the exception of the Chevrolet Corvette), was continued through the 1969 model year.

Vehicles underpinned

 1964-1969 Beaumont
 1964-1967 Buick Sport Wagon
 1964-1967 Buick Skylark
 1964-1969 Buick Special
 1964-1967 Chevrolet Chevelle
 1964-1967 Chevrolet El Camino
 1964-1967 Oldsmobile Vista Cruiser
 1964-1967 Oldsmobile 442
 1964-1967 Oldsmobile Cutlass and F-85
 1964-1967 Pontiac GTO
 1964-1967 Pontiac Tempest
 1964-1967 Pontiac LeMans
 1966-1967 Oldsmobile Cutlass Supreme

1968-1972

All GM A-bodies were completely restyled in 1968. The 400 cu in limit remained. It was removed in 1970, mainly due to Chrysler's domination in the drag racing and muscle car market with larger engines and highest power rated engines available in nearly all Chrysler "B" platform models. This led each of the four GM divisions to offer their largest engines: Chevrolet's  in the Chevelle SS-454, Pontiac's  in the GTO, Oldsmobile's  in the 442, and Buick's  in the GS.

The two-door had a  wheelbase; four-door, station wagon, and the El Camino had a  wheelbase; and the stretched-wheelbase wagon had a  wheelbase. 1968 model year A-body 2-door hardtops and convertibles had a vent wing window assembly - 1969-72 models had a one piece door glass where GM's Astro Ventilation system (first used with the 1966 Buick Riviera) was phased in.

Also using a variation of the A-body chassis and suspension were the 1969-1972 Pontiac Grand Prix and 1970-1972 Chevrolet Monte Carlo — both of which were marketed as intermediate-sized personal luxury cars and coded as G-body cars. The Grand Prix had a  wheelbase and the Monte Carlo had a   wheelbase. When the A- and G-body cars were restyled for 1973, the G-body design was renamed the A-special body.

Vehicles underpinned

 1968-1972 Buick Skylark
 1968-1972 Buick Sport Wagon
 1968-1972 Chevrolet Chevelle 
 1968-1972 Chevrolet El Camino
 1968-1972 Oldsmobile 442
 1968-1972 Oldsmobile Cutlass
 1968-1972 Oldsmobile Cutlass Supreme
 1968-1972 Oldsmobile Vista Cruiser
 1968-1972 Pontiac GTO
 1968-1970 Pontiac Tempest
 1968-1972 Pontiac LeMans
 1971-1972 GMC Sprint

1973–1977

All GM A- and A-special body cars were completely restyled for 1973 with hardtop and convertible bodystyles eliminated due to pending Federal safety regulations. The 1973-77 cars were available in sedans, coupes and station wagons. General Motors described the pillared bodystyles with frameless doors and windows as "Colonnade" styling. Wheelbases for this generation were 112 for two-door coupes and 116 for four-door sedans and wagons.

By this time, the American performance car was considered extinct, but these "forgotten years" had some performance left.
1973 Pontiac LeMans with the GTO option and the Pontiac Grand Am — Available with a 400 cid  V8 which was available with a 3-speed (LeMans, GTO) or 4-speed manual (LeMans, GTO, Grand Am) transmission or an automatic (LeMans, GTO, Grand Am), or a  455 with an automatic transmission only. Cars magazine tested an SD-455-equipped 1973 Pontiac GTO and chose it as Car Of The Year, yet that engine never made it to production in a GTO or other Pontiac A-body, but would be limited to the Firebird Formula and Trans Am.
The SS was replaced for 1974 by the Laguna Type S-3 which offered the same engine/transmission offerings as the '73 SS plus the addition of a 400 small block V8, along with a urethane front end surrounding the grillework. The 1975-76 Laguna S-3 featured a more aerodynamic slanted front end but engines were further detuned due to emission requirements and the advent of the catalytic converter, leaving the big 454 V8 unavailable for California cars in 1975 and discontinued altogether for 1976, when the  small block 400 V8 was the top engine.
1973-1974 Buick Century GS — Still available with the Stage 1 455 cid V8 rated at 270 net horsepower, mated to either a Turbo 400 or four-speed manual transmission, the latter transmission reportedly only installed in seven cars that year. This engine was also offered on other Buicks in 1974 including the Riviera, LeSabre and Electra.
1973-1975 Oldsmobile Cutlass Hurst/Olds W-30 — These were built using 455 cid V8 engines in the W-30 trim. This engine was also available as an option on the Olds 442 of those years along with other Cutlass models.
1976 Buick Century Turbo — These were originally built as Indianapolis Pace Car replicas with a turbocharged and carbureted 3.8 L V6, and were faster than the 455 V8 version of that year. There were only a little over 1,200 built.
Only 1,100 or so of these were made and are getting quite collectible.

Vehicles underpinned

 1973-1977 Buick Century
 1973-1977 Buick Regal
 1973-1977 Chevrolet Chevelle
 1973-1977 Chevrolet El Camino
 1973-1977Chevrolet Monte Carlo
 1973-1977 GMC Sprint
 1973-1977 Oldsmobile 442
 1973-1977 Oldsmobile Cutlass
 1973-1977 Oldsmobile Cutlass Supreme
 1973-1977 Pontiac Grand Am
 1973-1977 Pontiac Grand Prix
 1973-1977 Pontiac LeMans
 1977-1977 Pontiac Can Am

1978–1981

All GM intermediate-sized cars were downsized for the 1978 model year in response to CAFE requirements and the increased popularity of smaller cars. The redesigned models were similar in size to the previous X-bodies.

The Buick and Oldsmobile were introduced with fastback coupe styles, while the Chevrolet and Pontiac received notchbacks. Four-door fastback sedan models were also available. An interesting design compromise was non-lowering rear door windows on four-door sedans and wagons, which also reverted to full window frames while two-door models including the El Camino retained frameless glass. Performance applications included the Chevrolet Malibu F41 and M80, Pontiac LeMans GT, Oldsmobile 442 and Oldsmobile Hurst/Olds.

In 1982, with the introduction of the new front-wheel drive A-body, existing rear-wheel drive models were given the G-body designation.

Vehicles underpinned

 1978-1980 Chevrolet Monte Carlo
 1978-1981 GMC Caballero
 1978-1981 Buick Century
 1978-1981 Buick Regal
 1978-1981 Chevrolet El Camino
 1978-1981 Chevrolet Malibu
 1978-1981 Oldsmobile Cutlass Supreme
 1978-1981 Oldsmobile Cutlass
 1978-1981 Pontiac LeMans
 1978-1981 Pontiac Grand Prix
 1978-1981 Pontiac Grand Am

References

List of GM VIN codes

A 1